K. Rajagopal is an Indian film editor who has worked predominantly in Malayalam cinema. He has achieved P. A. Backer Award for the editing of Celluloid in 2012, Kerala State Film Award for the editing of Oru Indian Pranayakadha in 2013 and Film Producers Association Award for the editing of Celluloid in 2012.

Personal life 
Rajagopal was born to Mathakkode Veettil Krishnan Kutty and Kunnampalli Veettil Padmavathy at Panangattiri, Kollangode in Palakkad district. He is married to Linda Janet. He completed his primary education from Panangattiri UP school and Kollengode Raja's high school.

Filmography
Since 1971, he started his career with G. Venkittaraman, senior Malayalam film editor and worked as his assistant in more than 200 Malayalam films. Theere Pratheekshikkathe was his first independent work in 1984.

Awards 
 P. A. Backer
 Kerala State Film Awards 
 2014-Film Producers Association Award.

References

External links 
 
 റാങ്കർ.കോം - കെ.രാജഗോപാൽ എഡിറ്റു ചെയ്ത ചിത്രങ്ങളുടെ പട്ടിക
 Moviebuff-കെ.രാജഗോപാൽ എഡിറ്റു ചെയ്ത ചിത്രങ്ങളുടെ പട്ടിക
 Mubi.com-കെ.രാജഗോപാൽ എഡിറ്റു ചെയ്ത ചിത്രങ്ങളുടെ പട്ടിക

1952 births
Malayalam film editors
Kerala State Film Award winners
Film editors from Kerala
Living people